Iran University of Medical Sciences (IUMS) (Danushgah-e 'lum-e Pezeshki-ye vâ Xedâmat-e Behedashti-ye Dârmani-ye Iran) is a high ranked medical university in Iran. According to "Times Impact Ranking 2019", IUMS has been chosen as 1st university in the nation & 41st in the world, Also 1st in the nation & 55th in 2020.

Located in Tehran, it was founded in 1974 under the name The Imperial Medical Center, and designed by William Pereira and Associates.

The school was state operated, and its current reincarnation trains 9,000 students in the medical field.

Its students rank among the very top 1% of Iran's students in the national ranking entrance exams for universities.

The University operates 11 schools (Medicine, Nursing & Midwifery, Public Health, Health Management and Information Sciences, Mental Health & Behavioral Sciences, Rehabilitation Sciences, Advanced technologies in Medicine, Allied Medical Sciences and Medicine, dentistry and Pharmacy in its International Campus), two centers, two institutes, twenty-nine research centers, seventeen teaching and fifteen non-teaching hospitals in Tehran.

IUMS is the activist & well-known medical college in the nation for participation in development of cognitive sciences & related technologies. "Brain & Cognition Clinic(BCC)" is first and only center established for expansion of cognitive sciences by their clinical application. Also, Iran psychiatric hospital has been mobilized by cognitive lab.

"DBS Project" is a national plan which was recommended by cognitive center depended to Iran president office; This project develops manufacturing of battery & electrode in deep brain stimulation. Hazrate-rasoul medical center as the national center for DBS surgeries in participation with Sharif university of technology, university of Tehran & Amirkabir university of technology, altogether try to make country independent in DBS.

Central Library 

The Central Library and Documentation Center was established simultaneously with the medical center in 1974. In less than two years, it started working by collecting thousands of scientific journals and various books in different branches of medical sciences. It also had direct communication via satellite with the U.S.'s medical information center. The new Central Library building, with an infrastructure of about 10,000 square meters and 11 floors, was constructed in September 2012. The outlook of the Central Library is giving efficient information services at the national and international levels.

The Central Library comprises a digital study hall, a study hall for females, a study hall for post graduate students, a hall of books and journals, technical services, indexing theses, an audiovisual section, e-learning and workshops, a general reading hall, University fair, and a publication store.

Hospitals and educational centers 
Hazrat-e Rasool General Hospital
Hazrat-e Fatemeh Plastic and Reconstructive Surgery Hospital
Hazrat-e Ali Asghar Pediatrics Hospital

Shafa Yahyaeian Orthopedics Hospital
Shahid Akbar-Abadi Gynecology & Obstetrics Hospital
Shahid Motahari Burns Hospital
Shahid Hashemi Nejad Urology Hospital
Iran Psychiatric Hospital
Firoozgar General Hospital
Field Hospital
Shohadaye Haft-e Tir Hospital
Firoozabadi Hospital
Lowlagar Hospital
Shohadaye Yaft Abad Hospital
Shahid Fahmideh Pediatrics Hospital
Emam Sajad Hospital (Shahriyar)
Hazrat-e Fatemeh Hospital (Robat Karim)

Research Centers 
Iran University of Medical Sciences has different research centers in different fields. The names of Research Centers:

Research Institute of Endocrinology & Metabolism, Research Institute for Islamic & Complementary Medicine, Cellular & Molecular Research Center, Razi Drug Research Center, Physiology Research Center, Immunology Research Center, Onco-pathology Research Center, Anti-Microbial Resistance Research Center, Otolaryngology, Head & Neck Surgery Research Center, Iran Eye Research Center, Minimal Invasive Surgery Research Center, Pediatric Infectious Diseases Research Center, Occupational Medicine Research Center, Mental Health Research Center, Gastro intestinal & Liver Diseases Research Center, Rehabilitation Research Center, Center for Nursing Care Research, Occupational Health Research Center, Hospital Management Research Center, Health Management & Economics Research Center, Medical Education Research Center, Rajaie Cardiovascular Medical & Research, Center, Echocardiography Research Center, Heart Valve Diseases Research Center, Cardiac Electrophysiology Research Center, Cardiovascular Interventional Research Center, Colorectal Research Center, Bone & Joint Reconstruction Research Center.

See also
Higher Education in Iran
List of universities in Iran
List of hospitals in Iran
Iran University of Medical Sciences's library management system

References

External links
Official website

1974 establishments in Iran
Medical schools in Iran
Iran University of Medical Sciences
Educational institutions established in 1974
William Pereira buildings